The 2020–21 Men's FIH Pro League was the second season of the Pro League, the premier men's field hockey national team league series. The tournament started in January 2020 and finished in June 2021.

Format changes
The home and away principle was kept but this principle is split over two consecutive seasons from this season onwards and works according to the following example:
in season 2020-21, Team A hosted Team B twice within a couple of days
in season 2021-22:, Team B will host Team A twice within a couple of days

COVID-19 pandemic interruption
Due to the outbreak of COVID-19, Hockey Australia decided to suspend all international travels for its national teams until further notice in early March. Later Hockey New Zealand took the same decision.

Once declared as a pandemic on 11 March, the FIH and all participating National Associations involved in the competition decided to put all the matches scheduled until 15 April on hold. Furthermore, it was agreed that the current edition is maintained, no matches will be played after the Olympic Games and depending on the evolution of the situation and the decisions of the public authorities, every match which can be organized between late April and before the Olympics, shall be played. On 19 March, it was announced by the FIH that all the matches scheduled to play until 17 May were put on hold. On 24 April, the league was extended until June 2021. The restart for September 2020, was announced on 9 July. Because not all matches are due to be played before the end of the season, the final ranking will be determined by points percentage instead of total points.

On 28 May, it was announced that despite the efforts of the involved federations, the matches set to play before the announcing date were going to be the last of the edition.

Teams
Nine teams competed in a round-robin tournament, being played from January to June.

 (4)
 (1)
 (2)
 (6)
 (7)
 (5)
 (3)
 (9)
 (8)

Squads

Results

Standings

All times are local.

Fixtures

Goalscorers

See also
2020–21 Women's FIH Pro League

Notes

References

External links
Official website

FIH Pro League
FIH Pro League
Men
FIH Pro League
FIH Pro League